César Alejandro Rodríguez "Ces" Cotos (born 7 March 2000) is a Venezuelan footballer who plays as a central midfielder for Polvorín FC.

Club career
Born in Barquisimeto, Cotos moved to A Coruña, Spain with only five months of age, and began his career with local side CD Calasanz at the age of six. In 2010, he joined Deportivo de La Coruña's youth sides.

In 2019, after finishing his formation, Cotos signed for Tercera División side UD Paiosaco. On 1 September of the following year, after featuring regularly, he moved to fellow league team Ourense CF.

On 22 January 2022, Cotos left Ourense and signed for Super League Greece 2 side Olympiacos Volos FC. He made his debut for the club eight days later, coming on as a first-half substitute and scoring the equalizer in a 1–1 away draw against Apollon Larissa FC. He scored four goals in 17 appearances during the second half of the season, as his side suffered relegation.

In 2022, Cotos returned to Spain and agreed to a contract with CD Lugo, being assigned to the farm team in Segunda Federación. He made his first team debut on 23 October of that year, replacing Jaume Cuéllar in a 2–0 Segunda División home win over Burgos CF.

References

External links

2000 births
Living people
Sportspeople from Barquisimeto
Spanish footballers
Venezuelan footballers
Association football midfielders
Segunda División players
Segunda Federación players
Tercera División players
Tercera Federación players
Ourense CF players
Polvorín FC players
CD Lugo players
Super League Greece 2 players
Olympiacos Volos F.C. players
Spanish expatriate footballers
Venezuelan expatriate footballers
Spanish expatriate sportspeople in Greece
Venezuelan expatriate sportspeople in Greece
Expatriate footballers in Greece